Graeme MacGregor  (born 14 June 1993) is a Scottish footballer who plays primarily as a defender.

MacGregor was with Bolton Wanderers as a youth and played for Scotland under-19. He was released by Bolton Wanderers in June 2012 and signed for St Mirren in September 2012. He then played for East Stirlingshire for two years, before signing for East Fife in July 2015.

Career
MacGregor began his career as a youth player for Falkirk, before joining Bolton Wanderers aged 16 in 2009. He progressed through the youth teams before becoming a member of Bolton's reserve team. He made 12 appearances for the reserves during the 2011–12 season.

On 31 January 2012, MacGregor joined Scottish First Division team Hamilton Academical on loan until the end of the 2011–12 season, after impressing on trial. He was included in the squad for the first time on 7 April 2012, where he was an unused substitute in Hamilton's defeat to Raith Rovers. On 5 May 2012, he made his début on the last day of the season in a 2–2 draw with Partick Thistle. At the end of the season his loan ended and he returned to Bolton, but was released by the club.

On 10 September 2012, MacGregor signed for Scottish Premier League side St Mirren until the end of the 2012–13 season. In March 2013 MacGregor signed for East Stirlingshire; he was then released by them at the end of the 2014–15 season. He signed for East Fife in July 2015, making his competitive debut in a cup victory over Dumbarton. After six months with the Fifers, MacGregor moved to Linlithgow Rose where he stayed until the end of the 2015–16 season, subsequently returning to East Stirlingshire in June 2016 following their relegation to the Lowland League.

Career statistics

References

External links

1993 births
Living people
Footballers from Falkirk
Scottish footballers
Scotland youth international footballers
Association football defenders
Falkirk F.C. players
Bolton Wanderers F.C. players
Hamilton Academical F.C. players
St Mirren F.C. players
Scottish Football League players
Scottish Professional Football League players
East Stirlingshire F.C. players
East Fife F.C. players
Linlithgow Rose F.C. players